Robert Wilson (born 1957) is a British crime writer currently resident in Portugal. He is the son of an RAF fighter pilot, and has a degree in English from Oxford. Wilson is the author of the Bruce Medway series, set in and around Benin, West Africa, and the Javier Falcón series, set largely in Seville, Spain. He is also the author of the espionage novel The Company of Strangers and A Small Death In Lisbon, which consists of a historically split narrative, and won the CWA Gold Dagger in 1999. He was shortlisted for the same award again in 2003 for The Blind Man of Seville, the first in the Javier Falcón series. The second novel in the series, The Silent and the Damned (titled: The Vanished Hands in the United States), won the 2006 Gumshoe Award for Best European Crime Novel, presented by Mystery Ink.

The Javier Falcón series has been adapted for Sky television by Mammoth Screen titled Falcón with Marton Csokas in the title role.

Bibliography

Bruce Medway series
 Instruments of Darkness – 1995
 The Big Killing – 1996
 Blood Is Dirt – 1997
 A Darkening Stain – 1998

Javier Falcón series
 The Blind Man of Seville – 2003
 The Silent and the Damned – 2004 (published as The Vanished Hands in the US)
 The Hidden Assassins – 2006
 The Ignorance of Blood – 2009

Charles Boxer series
 Capital Punishment – 2013
 You Will Never Find Me – 2014
 Stealing People – 2015

Non-series novels
 A Small Death in Lisbon – 1999
 The Company of Strangers – 2001

References

External links
 

British crime fiction writers
1957 births
Living people
British male novelists
20th-century British novelists
21st-century British novelists
Alumni of the University of Oxford
British expatriates in Portugal
20th-century British male writers
21st-century British male writers